Two vessels served the British Royal Navy as His Majesty's Hired armed cutter Hero.  Under the command of Lieutenant John Reynolds, the second hired armed cutter Hero captured some 30 merchantmen during the Gunboat War before the Royal Navy returned her to her owners. She was so successful that the Norwegian merchants offered a considerable reward for Hero's capture.

There was also an hired armed lugger Hero, and a number of British letters of marque that carried the name Hero, and that were cutters. None of the letter of marque cutters match the description of either hired armed cutter Hero.

The first hired armed cutter Hero
The first hired armed cutter Hero carried nine 12-pounder carronades and was of 77 tons (bm). She served the Royal Navy from 20 August 1804 to 3 February 1805.

The second hired armed cutter Hero
The second hired armed cutter Hero carried ten 12-pounder carronades and was of 119 tons (bm). She served the Royal Navy from 4 May 1809 to 11 November 1811. 

Whilst under the command of Lieutenant John Reynolds, Hero commenced cruising in The Sleeve (Kattegat) in 1809.

Some of her first captures included:
Fortuna (4 November);-
Four Sisters (9 November), captured by the hired armed cutter Idas with Hero in company;
Emanuel (11 November);
Charlotta Maria (21 November);
Haabet (23 November);
Catharina Christiana (29 November); and
Jonge Frau Maria (9 January 1810).

In 1810 Reynolds discovered that Sälö Fjord, then little known to the British, was a good place of refuge during gales on the Swedish coast. He surveyed it and reported that it was busy. 

In April Hero captured:
Mercurious (9 April);
Mette Catharine and Speculation (14 April);
Pedre Oxe (21 April).

On 21 October Hero captured Carl Frederick. One month later, on 21 November 1810 Hero captured the Catharina Christiana. 

In early 1811 Hero met with more success in her prize-taking as she captured:
Klitloben (10 January);
Siri (10 March);
Sloop No. 98 (14 March);
Haas Fagar and Emanuel (15 March);
Three Brothers (13 April);
Haabet;
Schroeder, Providentia, Anna Maria Cecilia, Maria Kirstina, and Concordia (15 April);

However, on 25 April 1811 Hero, while in the company of the Hired armed cutter Swan, encountered three Danish gunboats in The Sleeve. Swan was forced to surrender but sank off Uddevalla, on the Swedish coast north of Gothenburg, almost immediately after the Danes boarded her. The battle apparently also resulted in damage to Hero. A frigate helped her into Vingo where she was repaired enough to sail to England for more complete repairs. She arrived at Dover on 7 May. 

Still, on 14 July she captured Margaretta, Ebenetzer, and Sophie. On 13 October she captured Fortuna. On 22 July Hero was in company when the gun-brig  captured Trajen and Freden. Lastly, on 19 October she captured the Danish galliot Haabet. She returned to Dover on 17 November from the Baltic having again been much damaged in an engagement with Danish gun boats. 

Reynolds removed to the Nimble-class cutter  early in 1812. Nimble was wrecked in the Kattegat in October, near the Sälö Beacon, but with no loss of life.

Post script
Reportedly, Hero spent from end 1812 to 1814 re-fitting at Sheerness. If so, she was not on the rolls of the Royal Navy.

Hired armed lugger Hero
The hired armed lugger Hero served the Royal Navy in 1809 and is described as being of 40 tons burthen.

British privateer cutter Hero
On 18 July 1812, the Baltimore schooner Falcon, of 172 tons, four guns and sixteen men, under the command of Captain John Wilson, was sailing from Boston to Bordeaux. Off the coast of France she encountered the "British cutter Hero", of five guns and 50 men. Hero sailed off after failing in three attempts during the two-hour running fight to board Falcon. This Hero may have been the cutter under the command of John Feaste, of 72 tons burthen, that sailed under a letter of marque dated 28 April 1812. (The letter further describes Hero as being armed with eight 3 and 6-pounder guns, and having a crew of 30 men.

The next day the British privateer Dart, of six guns and 40 men, succeeded in capturing Falcon after a fight of over an hour in which Wilson and several of his men were wounded. Dart then took Falcon into Guernsey. This may have been the cutter Dart, under the command of Thomas Guilbert, of 114 tons burthen, armed with six 4-pounder guns and with a letter of marque dated 20 May 1812.

Notes, citations, and references
Notes

Citations

References

Anderson, Roger Charles (1910) Naval wars in the Baltic: during the sailing-ship epoch, 1522-1850. (London: C. Gilbert-Wood).
Cranwell, John Philips, and William Bowers Crane (1940) Men of Marque: A History of Private Armed Vessels out of Baltimore During the War of 1812. (New York: W.W. Norton).
Gossett, William Patrick (1986) The lost ships of the Royal Navy, 1793-1900. (London: Mansell).

Maclay, Edgar Stanton (2004) A History of American Privateers. (Digital Antiquaria).

Hired armed vessels of the Royal Navy
1800s ships